3x3 Ljubljana – Brezovica is a professional 3x3 basketball club based in Ljubljana, Slovenia. The team plays in the FIBA 3x3 World Tour. In 2013, the club was based in Brezovica, near Ljubljana.

Players

Current roster

Winning rosters
2016 Tour 
 Jasmin Hercegovac, Aleš Kunc, Tomo Čajič, Blaž Črešnar 

2013 Tour 
 Rok Smaka, Jasmin Hercegovac, Aleš Kunc, Blaž Črešnar

Season by season

Trophies and awards

Trophies
FIBA 3x3 World Tour: (2)
2013, 2016

Individual awards
FIBA 3x3 World Tour MVP
 Jasmin Hercegovac – 2016

References

External links
Facebook Page

FIBA 3x3 World Tour teams
Basketball teams established in 2013
Basketball teams in Slovenia